On 18 July 2022, a Fokker 50 operated by Jubba Airways on a domestic flight from Baidoa to Mogadishu crashed while landing on runway 5 at Aden Adde International Airport, Mogadishu, Somalia. All 36 occupants survived the crash, with 16 injured passengers being hospitalized.

Accident 

The Jubba Airways flight departed Shatigadud International Airport, in Baidoa, Somalia, on a  domestic flight to Aden Adde International Airport, in Mogadishu, Somalia. While landing on runway 5 in calm winds, the left wing struck the ground at 11:28 am (EAT) and separated at the root causing the aircraft to roll over and skid off the runway. A small fire broke out but was quickly extinguished by airport firefighters. Soldiers from the 2nd Security Force Assistance Brigade of the United States Army were present at the time of the crash conducting medical training and swiftly helped administer aid and evacuate the 16 injured passengers to hospitals for treatment. There were no fatalities. The Somali Civil Aviation Authority has opened an investigation into the crash; the cause is yet to be determined.

Aircraft 
The accident aircraft was a 30-year-old Fokker 50 with the registration number 5Y-JXN. The aircraft was sold to Jubba Airways in 2017. It was previously operated by seven different airlines and the United Nations.

References 

Accidents and incidents involving the Fokker 50
Aviation accidents and incidents in Somalia
Aviation accidents and incidents in 2022
July 2022 events in Africa
2022 in Somalia
2022 disasters in Somalia
2020s in Mogadishu